Donell David Gordon (born 21 November 2003) is an English professional footballer who plays as a midfielder for League Two club Swindon Town.

Career
Gordon started his career with Swindon Town, making his first-team debut during an EFL Trophy second round tie in November 2021 against Colchester United, replacing fellow academy graduate debutant, Levi Francis in the 57th minute as the Robins fell to a 2–1 defeat.

Career statistics

References

External links

2003 births
Living people
English footballers
Association football midfielders
Swindon Town F.C. players
English Football League players